was a district located in Mie Prefecture, Japan.

As of 2003, the district had an estimated population of 11,590 and a density of 106.33 persons per km2. The total area was 109.00 km2.

Towns and villages
The district had only one town left before dissolution:
 Aoyama

Merger
 On November 1, 2004 - the town of Aoyama was merged with the city of Ueno, the towns of Iga (former) Ayama, and the villages of Ōyamada and Shimagahara (all from Ayama District) to create the city of Iga. Naga District was dissolved as a result of this merger.

Former districts of Mie Prefecture